West Macquarie, an electoral district of the Legislative Assembly in the Australian state of New South Wales was created in 1859 and abolished in 1904.


Election results

Elections in the 1900s

1901

Elections in the 1890s

1898

1895

1894

1891

1890 by-election

Elections in the 1880s

1889

1887

1885

1884 by-election

1882

1880

Elections in the 1870s

1877

1875

1872

Elections in the 1860s

1869

1864

1860

Elections in the 1850s

1859 by-election

1859

Notes

References 

New South Wales state electoral results by district